The women's C-1 200 metres competition at the 2021 ICF Canoe Sprint World Championships in Copenhagen took place on Lake Bagsværd.

Schedule
The schedule was as follows:

All times are Central European Summer Time (UTC+2)

Results

Heats
The fastest three boats in the first heat advanced directly to the final. The fastest four boats in the second heat also advanced directly to the final as two boats were tied for third place.
The next four/three fastest boats in the first/second heats respectively, plus the fastest remaining boat advanced to the semifinal.

Heat 1

Heat 2

Semifinal
The fastest three boats advanced to the final.

Final
Competitors raced for positions 1 to 10, with medals going to the top three.

References

ICF
ICF